Rajendra Kumar Rai is a Nepalese politician formerly serving as a Cabinet Minister, government of Nepal, who is a member of the House of Representatives for Dhankuta 1. He belongs to the CPN (Unified Marxist–Leninist). He also served as the deputy chair of Pakhribas VDC from 1994 to 1999.

References 

Living people
Communist Party of Nepal (Unified Marxist–Leninist) politicians
People from Dhankuta District
Nepal MPs 2017–2022
1964 births
Nepal MPs 2022–present